Luz Carolina Gudiño Corro (born 19 November 1981) is a Mexican politician from the Institutional Revolutionary Party. From 2009 to 2010 she served as Deputy of the LXI Legislature of the Mexican Congress representing Veracruz.

References

1981 births
Living people
People from Veracruz (city)
Women members of the Chamber of Deputies (Mexico)
Institutional Revolutionary Party politicians
Politicians from Veracruz
21st-century Mexican politicians
21st-century Mexican women politicians
Deputies of the LXI Legislature of Mexico
Members of the Chamber of Deputies (Mexico) for Veracruz